The 2006–07 NLA season was the 69th regular season of the Nationalliga A (NLA), the main professional ice hockey league in Switzerland.

New Rules
There are a few changes of rules for the new season.

3-Point System
For the first time an NLA season is run with a 3-point system. A team gets now 3 points for a win after 60 minutes, instead of 2.

Overtime
A tied game after 60 minutes results in an overtime of 5 minutes, which is played 4 vs. 4 (this is not a rule change). But now, if a team scores a goal it gets two points while the other team also gets a point.

Penalty Shootout
If the game still remains tied after the overtime, there will be a penalty shootout with 3 shots per team. The winner team will get two points and the other team one point.

Regular season

Final standings

Scoring leaders

Note: GP = Games played; G = Goals; A = Assists; Pts = Points;  PIM = Penalty Minutes

Playoffs

Quarterfinals

Semifinals

Finals

Scoring leaders

Note: GP = Games played; G = Goals; A = Assists; Pts = Points;  PIM = Penalty Minutes

Relegation (Playout)

After the conclusion of the regular season, the bottom 4 teams will compete in a 4-team elimination playoff, with the losing team advancing to determine which team will face the champions of the National League B. The winner of the best-of-7 series will play in the National League A next season, while the losing team will play in the National League B.

Semifinals

Finals

League Qualification

References
sehv.ch

Results from Puck.ch
LNA Regular Season 2006-2007

External links
hockeyfans.ch

1
Swiss